The 1942–43 OB I bajnokság season was the seventh season of the OB I bajnokság, the top level of ice hockey in Hungary. Four teams participated in the final round, and BBTE Budapest won the championship.

First round

Gruppe Budapest 
BBTE Budapest and BKE Budapest qualified for final round, Ferencvárosi TC failed to qualify.

Felvidék Group

Erdély Group 
 Marosvásárhelyi SE and Kolozsvári KE qualified for final round.

Final round

Semifinals 
 BBTE Budapest - Marosvásárhelyi SE 5:4
 BKE Budapest - Kolozsvári KE 2:0

Final 
 BBTE Budapest - BKE Budapest

External links
 Season on hockeyarchives.info

Hun
OB I bajnoksag seasons
1942–43 in Hungarian ice hockey